Trichromia yahuasae is a moth of the family Erebidae. It was described by James John Joicey and George Talbot in 1916. It is found in Peru.

References

 

yahuasae
Moths described in 1916